Rosinsky or Rosinský (Slovak feminine: Rosinská) is a surname. Notable people with this surname include:

 Ján Rosinský (born 1952), Slovak football player and manager
 Sofia Rosinsky (born 2006), American actress
 Will Rosinsky (born 1984), American boxer and firefighter

See also
 
 Rosinski

Slovak-language surnames